The 36th Fajr Film Festival (Persian: سی و ششمین جشنواره فیلم فجر) was held from 1 to 11 February 2018 in Tehran, Iran. The nominees for the 36th Fajr Film Festival were announced on February 10, 2018, at a press conference.

Jury

Main Competition 
 Bahram Badakhshani
 Kamal Tabrizi
 Hassan Khojasteh
 Khosrow Dehghan
 Rasul Sadr Ameli
 Fereshteh Taerpour
 Mohammad Reza Foroutan

Winners and nominees

Films

Main Competition

References 

Fajr International Film Festival ceremonies